Hydesville Tower School is a coeducational independent school located in Walsall in the West Midlands, England. The school is owned and operated by Cognita, the largest independent schools provider in the UK.

Hydesville Tower School, which overlooks Walsall Arboretum, was established in 1952. It comprises a nursery, prep school and senior school and is the only coeducational independent school in Walsall to offer secondary education.

The school curriculum includes the core subjects of English, mathematics and science, French, German, Spanish, geography, history, art, business studies, ICT, religious studies, music and physical education. The PE department makes use of the sports facilities at the nearby Walsall Campus of the University of Wolverhampton. Elocution is part of the Prep School timetable and personal, social and health education (PSHE) is delivered to pupils in the senior school.

References

External links
 Hydesville Tower School website
 Cognita 
 School Profile in Schoolguide  
 School Profile in Independent Schools Council (ISC)

Private schools in Walsall
Cognita
Educational institutions established in 1952
1952 establishments in England